Mike McGill (born November 21, 1946) is a former American football linebacker. He played for the Minnesota Vikings from 1968 to 1970 and for the St. Louis Cardinals from 1971 to 1972.

References

1946 births
Living people
American football linebackers
Notre Dame Fighting Irish football players
Minnesota Vikings players
St. Louis Cardinals (football) players